Shakti is a 2004 Bengali film directed by P. Sambhashiv Rao and produced by G. A. Sheshagiri Rao and Bijoy Khemka. The film has music composed by Chakri. It is a remake of 2003 Telugu film Satyam.

Cast
 Jeet as Shakti
 Raima Sen as Manasi
 Amitava Bhattacharya
 Biplab Chatterjee
 Shankar Chakraborty
 Dulal Lahiri
 Arun Bannerjee
 Moumita Gupta
 Parthasarathi Deb
 Sonali Chowdhury

Soundtrack
The album is composed by Chakri for Shakti.

References

External links
 Shakti at the Gomolo

Bengali remakes of Telugu films
2004 films
Bengali-language Indian films
2000s Bengali-language films